The Fairstead Estate is a suburb of King's Lynn, Norfolk, England. The population of Fairstead ward of King's Lynn and West Norfolk Borough at the 2011 Census was 6,479.

Facilities
Fairstead has two schools, Fairstead Community Primary School, a very large primary school, and Churchill Park School, which was completed in 2010 and is a merger of Alderman Jackson and Ethel Tipple Schools.

Fairstead has its own minor shopping zone, called Centre Point, with a doctor's surgery, a chemist and about 4-6 other shops. The Fairstead Community Centre is also situation at the Centre Point. It offers a Main Hall and 50 car parking spaces which includes disabled car parking.  At the other end of the estate there is a convenience store.

Fairstead has a small wooded area extending from the front of the school area.

The pub has been knocked down as the residents complained of it being an eyesore this was done through the Borough Council of King's Lynn & West Norfolk and West Norfolk police safer neighbourhood teams. Affordable housing is to be built on the site of the old pub.

References

King's Lynn and West Norfolk